Hugh Richard Campbell McMillan  is a Canadian folk/jazz/rock musician.

McMillan was a member of the folk rock band Spirit of the West, and is a multi-instrumentalist who has played guitars, bass, banjo, trombone, mandolins, Chapman stick, piano, and keyboards on the band's albums. He has also produced albums for a number of Canadian folk bands, and has collaborated with Canadian artists including Oscar Lopez, James Keelaghan.

References
 Band at sotw.ca

Canadian folk rock musicians
Canadian record producers
Canadian people of Scottish descent
Musicians from British Columbia
Canadian rock bass guitarists
1956 births
Living people
Spirit of the West members